Ariel Pink's Picks Vol. 1 is a compilation album of American recording artist R. Stevie Moore. Originally compiled by Ariel Pink in 2006, the album was officially released on cassette by Laughable Recordings in 2011. A double-vinyl release on Light in the Attic followed in 2015. Release and liner notes curated by Nick Noto (Ariel Pink's Dark Side).

Track listing
Track sources are provided by Moore.

References

External links

R. Stevie Moore albums
Ariel Pink
2011 compilation albums
Light in the Attic Records compilation albums